Kai Frobel is a German environmental ecologist. When he was young he lived very near the German part of the Iron Curtain, on the west side, near Coburg. He realized that the public-excluded security zone along the Iron Curtain had become a de facto wildlife reserve. When the Iron Curtain fell in 1989,  he was instrumental in getting these wildlife reserves preserved as the European Green Belt. He runs the Ribbon of Life project which seeks to preserve these areas. He is associated with the BUND (Bund für Umwelt und Naturschutz Deutschland).

Awards 
 Federal Cross of Merit (2020)

Notes

See also
European Green Belt

German environmentalists
Living people
People from Coburg (district)
Year of birth missing (living people)
Recipients of the Cross of the Order of Merit of the Federal Republic of Germany